Duke Ellington at the Bal Masque is an album by American pianist, composer and bandleader Duke Ellington recorded in 1958 and released on the Columbia label.

Reception
The Allmusic review by Scott Yanow stated: "the music works quite well for Ellington and his all-star orchestra manage to transform what could be a set of tired revival swing into superior dance music and swinging jazz. While certainly not the most essential Ellington record, At the Bal Masque is a surprise success".

Track listing
 "Alice Blue Gown" (Harry Tierney, Joseph McCarthy) - 3:02
 "Who's Afraid of the Big Bad Wolf" (Frank Churchill, Ann Ronell) - 2:53
 "Got a Date with an Angel" (Jack Waller, Joseph Turnbridge; Sonnie Miller, Clifford Grey) - 2:25
 "Poor Butterfly" (Raymond Hubbell, John Golden) - 3:40
 "Satan Takes a Holiday" (Larry Clinton) - 3:15
 "The Peanut Vendor" (Moisés Simons, Marion Sunshine, Wolfe Gilbert) - 3:33
 "Satin Doll" (Ellington, Billy Strayhorn, Johnny Mercer) - 3:48
 "Lady in Red" (Mort Dixon, Allie Wrubel) - 2:49
 "Indian Love Call" (Rudolf Friml, Herbert Stothart, Oscar Hammerstein II, Otto Harbach) - 3:36
 "The Donkey Serenade" (Friml, Stothart, George Forrest, Robert Wright) - 2:14
 "Gypsy Love Song" (Victor Herbert, Harry B. Smith) - 3:54
 "Laugh, Clown, Laugh" (Ted Fio Rito, Samuel Lewis, Joseph Young) - 3:02
Recorded at Columbia 30th Street Studios, New York on March 20 (tracks 3, 5 & 12), March 24 (tracks 4 & 6), March 26 (track 9), March 31 (tracks 1, 7, 8 & 10) and April 1 (tracks 2 & 11), 1958.

Personnel
Duke Ellington – piano
Cat Anderson, Shorty Baker, Willie Cook, Clark Terry - trumpet
Ray Nance- trumpet, violin on "Poor Butterfly" and "Gypsy Love Song"
Quentin Jackson, Britt Woodman - trombone
John Sanders - valve trombone
Jimmy Hamilton - clarinet, tenor saxophone
Johnny Hodges - alto saxophone
Russell Procope - alto saxophone, clarinet
Bill Graham - alto saxophone
Paul Gonsalves - tenor saxophone
Harry Carney - baritone saxophone
Jimmy Woode - bass
Sam Woodyard - drums

References

Columbia Records albums
Duke Ellington albums
1958 albums
Albums recorded at CBS 30th Street Studio